The 2021 season was Pakhtakor Tashkent's 30th season in the Uzbek League in Uzbekistan.

Season events
On 11 March 2021, the AFC confirmed Sharjah in the United Arab Emirates as the host city for Pakhtakor Tashkent's group matches in this years AFC Champions League.

On 20 August, Pakhtakor Tashkent extended their contracts with Po'latkhoja Kholdorkhonov and Abbosbek Fayzullayev until the end of 2023.

Squad

Out on loan

Transfers

Winter

In:

Out:

Summer

In:

Out:

Friendlies

Competitions

Super Cup

Uzbek League

League table

Results summary

Results by round

Results

Uzbek Cup

Final

AFC Champions League

Group stages

Squad statistics

Appearances and goals

|-
|colspan="14"|Players away on loan:
|-
|colspan="14"|Players who left Pakhtakor Tashkent during the season:

|}

Goal scorers

Clean sheets

Disciplinary Record

References

Sport in Tashkent
Pakhtakor Tashkent FK seasons
Pakhtakor Tashkent